Cyril James Fox (1889 – November 16, 1946) was a lawyer, judge and political figure in Newfoundland. He represented St. John's East in the Newfoundland and Labrador House of Assembly from 1919 on.

He was born in St. John's and educated at Saint Bonaventure's College. Fox studied law with William R. Warren and was called to the Newfoundland bar in 1916. He served as speaker for the Newfoundland assembly from 1924 to 1928. Fox retired from politics and returned to his law practice in 1928. He was named a King's Counsel in the same year. In 1944, he was named a justice in the Newfoundland Supreme Court. Fox served as the first chairman for the Newfoundland National Convention but died suddenly before the end of the convention.

Fox married Mary Cashin, the daughter of Michael Patrick Cashin.

References

External links 
 

1889 births
1946 deaths
Dominion of Newfoundland judges
People from St. John's, Newfoundland and Labrador
Speakers of the Newfoundland and Labrador House of Assembly
20th-century King's Counsel